Trade of Innocents is a 2012 American made thriller independent film written and directed by Christopher Bessette and starring Dermot Mulroney, Mira Sorvino, John Billingsley and Trieu Tran.

The film was shot on location in Bangkok, Thailand. It will look to bring awareness and involvement to work against human trafficking.

Plot
In the back streets of a tourist town in present-day Cambodia, we find a filthy cinder block room; a bed with soiled sheets; a little girl waits for the next man to use her. Alex, a human trafficking investigator plays the role of her next customer as he negotiates with the pimp for the use of the child. Claire, Alex's wife, is caught up in the flow of her new life in Southeast Asia and her role as a volunteer in an aftercare shelter for rescued girls. She, and Alex both still are dealing with their grief of losing a child years earlier. As both of them struggle in their own way to overcome the pain of their past and realities of child exploitation where they now live and work, they find themselves being pulled together into the lives of local neighborhood girls, whose freedom and dignity are threatened.

Cast
 Dermot Mulroney as Alex Becker
 Mira Sorvino as Claire Becker
 John Billingsley as Malcolm Eddery
 Trieu Tran as Duke
 Rena Yamada as little girl in the start

Production

Development
The inspiration of Trade of Innocents came from a combination of the experience of the director (Christopher Bessette) and his trip to Phnom Penh, and the producers Bill and Laurie Bolthouse experience on their trip Phnom Penh. Christopher Bessette and Bill and Laurie later came together to make the film.

Mira Sorvino has a longtime interest in supporting the cause of ending human trafficking. When asked about being in Trade of Innocents she said that "I felt it could be a powerful combination of my activist efforts and my artistic ventures."

Release
In January 2011, Monterey Media acquired the United States and Canada distribution rights for the film from Bicycle Peddler LLC.

Festivals
Trade of Innocents was selected to screen at the following film festivals:
2012 Breckenridge Festival of Film
2012 Toronto Cornerstone Film Festival

Theatrical release
The film will begin its theatrical released in on October 5 at the Quad Cinema in New York.

Critical reception
The film received a positive reaction from Entertainment Tonight calling it a "powerful and important new film". Media Mike's also called the film "a rare gem that will probably not be seen by many but it really deserves mainstream shot." On Rotten Tomatoes, the film has a score of 0% based on 7 critic reviews. On Metacritic, the film has an average weighted score of 29 out of 100 based on 6 critic reviews, indicating "Generally Unfavorable Reviews."

Awards

References

External links
 
 
 
 

2012 films
Films about prostitution in Thailand
Films about human trafficking
Works about sex trafficking
American independent films
2010s English-language films
2010s American films